Theodore Hugh Winters Jr. (March 11, 1913 – April 25, 2008) was a highly decorated United States Navy captain. He was a flying ace credited with eight aerial victories and was awarded two Navy Crosses during the battle of Leyte Gulf in World War II.

Early life and career 
Theodore H. Winters was born on March 11, 1913, in Society Hill, South Carolina. Upon graduating high school in 1931, Winters entered the United States Naval Academy at Annapolis, Maryland. On June 6, 1935, he graduated from the academy and was commissioned as an ensign in the Navy.

Ensign Winters was assigned to the USS Pennsylvania for one year as a gunnery officer, followed by one year aboard the USS Hamilton as a gunnery and communications officer. In June 1937, Winters was sent to Naval Air Station Pensacola, Florida, where he attended flight training. The following June, Lieutenant Junior Grade Winters graduated from the course and was designated as a Naval aviator. Winters was assigned to VB-5 aboard the USS Yorktown until June 1940. He then returned to Pensacola where he served as a flight instructor.

World War II 
From February to March 1942, Lieutenant Winters was assigned to the seaplane tender USS Matagorda. Afterwards, he was attached to Fighting Squadron 9 (VF-9) as the executive officer aboard the USS Ranger.

North Africa 
In November 1942, Lieutenant Commander Winters took part in Operation Torch in French Morocco. In one day, he led three combat missions, destroying 14 Vichy French bombers on the ground at Rabat-Sale Airdrome, followed by destroying more enemy planes at Port Lyautey and then attacking an enemy position at El Hank.

Although his aircraft was hit by enemy fire and he was wounded, Winters continued to lead his men throughout the next few days and destroyed 20 planes on the ground at Médiouna Airdrome. He then bombed enemy vehicles at Fedala and then attacked enemy destroyers in Casablanca Harbor. For his actions during the operation, Lieutenant Commander Winters was awarded his first Silver Star.

Pacific War 
Winters and his squadron returned to the United States by the end of November. In April 1943, VF-9 was attached to the USS Essex and set out for the Pacific. By August 1943, Winters was promoted to commander and was made the commanding officer of Fighting Squadron 19 (VF-19) aboard the USS Lexington.

By September 1944, VF-19 and other squadrons were flying combat missions over the Philippines in preparation for the invasion in October.  On September 12, Commander Winters shot down three Japanese planes. Winters claimed ace status and was awarded a second Silver Star by mid-October, shooting down three more enemy aircraft and probably downing a fourth.

On October 24, during the battle of Leyte Gulf, Commander Winters led his squadron through a barrage of anti-aircraft fire to inflict severe damage on two Japanese battleships and four cruisers. The next day, Winters continued leading his planes through barrages of anti-aircraft fire even though his own plane was damaged. His squadron assisted in the sinking of one fleet carrier and two light carriers. Commander Winters was awarded two Navy Crosses during this two day period.

On November 5, Commander Winters again led his squadron in attacking a Japanese cruiser and a destroyer in Manila Bay. Upon assisting in sinking the two ships, Winters shot down an enemy aircraft. Winters was awarded his third Silver Star and finished the war with a total of eight aerial victories.

Post-war career 
In January 1945, Winters was assigned to the training unit at Naval Air Station Jacksonville, Florida. He would stay there until the summer of 1947, when he attended the Armed Forces Staff College in Norfolk, Virginia. Upon graduating in January 1948, he was attached to the USS Midway. From July 1949 to February 1951, Winters was assigned as a faculty member at the Naval Academy, followed by an assignment aboard the USS Franklin D. Roosevelt.

He began attending the Naval War College in Newport, Rhode Island, in July 1953, graduating in February 1954. From 1959 to 1960, he served as the commanding officer of the USS Franklin D. Roosevelt. Captain Winters retired from the Navy on July 1, 1961.

Theodore H. Winters died from a stroke on April 25, 2008, in Lynchburg, Virginia. He was buried in Arlington National Cemetery.

Awards and decorations
CAPT Winters' awards include the following:

References 

1913 births
2008 deaths
20th-century American naval officers
American World War II flying aces
Aviators from South Carolina
Burials at Arlington National Cemetery
Joint Forces Staff College alumni
Recipients of the Navy Cross (United States)
Recipients of the Silver Star
Recipients of the Distinguished Flying Cross (United States)
Recipients of the Air Medal
United States Naval Aviators
United States Navy captains
United States Navy pilots of World War II